The 1996 Pacific Curling Championships were held from November 26 to 29 in Sydney, Australia.

Australia won the men's event over Japan (it was the sixth Pacific title for the Australian men). On the women's side, Japan defeated Australia in the final (it was the fifth Pacific title for the Japanese women).

By virtue of winning, the Australian men's team and the Japanese women's team qualified for the 1997 World  and  Curling Championships in Bern, Switzerland.

It was the first appearance at the Pacific championships for the men's and women's teams of South Korea.

Men

Teams

Round Robin

 Teams to playoffs

Playoffs

Semifinal

Final

Final standings

Women

Teams

Round Robin

 Team to final
 Teams to tie-break
"-" – no data about game result

Tie-break

Final

Final standings

References

General

Specific

Pacific Curling Championships, 1996
Pacific-Asia Curling Championships
International curling competitions hosted by Australia
1996 in Australian sport
Sports competitions in Sydney
November 1996 sports events in Australia